Sami Khan is a Pakistani actor and model.

Sami Khan may also refer to:

 Sami Khan (general), general in the Indian Army
 Sami Khan (filmmaker), Canadian filmmaker
 Sami Khan (child actor), Pakistani child actor